St Nicholas's Church is an Anglican church in the market town of Newport, Shropshire, England lying within the Diocese of Lichfield. It is dedicated to St Nicholas, the patron saint of fishermen. The church is a Grade II* listed building.

It is of Early English and Perpendicular architecture. The church sits on an island in the centre of the town and is the main focal point for miles around. The buttressed tower dates from 1360, but the site had been used since the 13th century in the times of Henry I.

History

The church was built in the 12th century with the tower being rebuilt in 1360. Thomas Draper bought the church from the Abbot of Shrewsbury in 1452 but it was not until 1700 that it gained its land and the rectory was endowed. The red brick north and south aisles were added in the 18th century. Galleries and gas lighting was added in 1837. The chancel was rebuilt in 1866. The church has been restored twice, the south side in 1883 and the north side from 1890 by John Norton. The west porch was built in 1904, a gift from Lady Boughey. Restoration work to the church was undertaken in the 1880s, by John Norton, to restore it to its current condition.

In 1912, politician Enoch Powell was baptised at the church where his parents previously had married in 1909.

In 1998 the Vicar, Roy Hibbert, was found guilty of fraud after overcharging parishioners for funerals and other services. For the 2019 Remembrance Day 200 poppies were knitted for the church.

Notable clergy
Michael Beasley, later Bishop of Hertford.

Architecture

The sandstone building consists of a chancel, south chapel, nave with aisles and a west tower. The stained glass includes a window in the chancel by Morris & Co. with Burne-Jones figures. One in the south chapel is by Charles Eamer Kempe.

The tower has 8 bells hung from wooden headstocks. Five of the bells were cast by Thomas Mears of the Whitechapel Bell Foundry in London in 1812. The two most recent were cast by John Taylor & Co of Loughborough in 1952.

In the churchyard is a sandstone memorial cross with brass plaques commemorating the men from the town who lost their lives in World War I and World War II.

See also
Grade II* listed buildings in Telford and Wrekin
Listed buildings in Newport, Shropshire

References

Bibliography

External links

St Nicholas's website

Church of England church buildings in Shropshire
Buildings and structures in Newport, Shropshire
13th-century church buildings in England